Danny Ervik (born 24 February 1989) is a Swedish footballer who plays as a defender.

References

External links
 

1989 births
Living people
Association football defenders
Swedish footballers
Allsvenskan players
Superettan players
Örgryte IS players
Falkenbergs FF players
GAIS players
Mjällby AIF players